Talwara can refer to:

Talwara, a town in Punjab state, India
Talwara, a town in Jammu and Kashmir state, India
Talwara Lake in Rajasthan state, India
Talwara Mughlan, a union council in Sialkot Tehsil of Punjab province, Pakistan
Talwar a type of South Asian sword.

List of lake in India
 List of lakes in India